A Promise to the Dead: The Exile Journey of Ariel Dorfman is a 2007 Canadian documentary film directed by Peter Raymont. The film is based on the 1998 memoir Heading South, Looking North by long-exiled Chilean writer and human rights activist Ariel Dorfman, and profiles him during a trip back to his homeland.

The film's production, initially slated for early 2006, was delayed by the illness and death of Raymont's wife, Lindalee Tracey. Raymont almost dropped out of the film, before deciding that having a project to work on would help him process his grief. The film had its theatrical premiere at the 2007 Toronto International Film Festival, and was broadcast on television by Bravo in February 2008.

The film was named to the initial longlist for the Academy Award for Best Documentary Feature, but did not make the final shortlist. It was named to TIFF's annual year-end Canada's Top Ten list for 2007, and won the Donald Brittain Award at the 23rd Gemini Awards.

References

External links 
 

2007 films
2007 documentary films
2000s Canadian films
Canadian documentary films
Documentary films about writers
Donald Brittain Award winning shows
Films based on memoirs
Films directed by Peter Raymont
Films scored by Mark Korven